The 1968–69 NBA season was the Detroit Pistons' 21st season in the NBA and 12th season in the city of Detroit.  The team played at Cobo Arena in Detroit.  

The Pistons finished with a 32-50 (.390), 6th place in the Eastern Division.  The team fired coach Donnie Butcher after 22 games, replacing him with assistant Paul Seymour in December. 
Seymour pushed for what would become an ill-advised trade, dealing All-Star and future Hall of Famer Dave DeBusschere to the New York Knicks for journeyman Howard Komives and 7-footer Walt Bellamy, also a Hall of Famer, but one who had worn out welcomes in Baltimore and New York, having a reputation as a malcontent. He proved it in Detroit, lasting a mere 109 games, traded to the Atlanta Hawks a year later, netting the Pistons John Arthurs, who would never play for Detroit.  DeBusschere became the final component needed for the 1970 NBA champion Knicks.  

Detroit was led on the season by guard Dave Bing (23.4 ppg, 7.1 apg, NBA All-Star) and forward Happy Hairston (18.1 ppg, 11.8 rpg).

Roster

Regular season

Season standings

x – clinched playoff spot

Record vs. opponents

Game log

Awards and records
Dave DeBusschere, All-NBA Second Team

References

Detroit
Detroit Pistons seasons
Detroit Pistons
Detroit Pistons